The Oscar Peterson Trio with Roy Eldridge, Sonny Stitt and Jo Jones at Newport is a 1957 live album by Oscar Peterson, accompanied by Roy Eldridge, Sonny Stitt and Jo Jones, recorded at the 1957 Newport Jazz Festival.

Track listing
 "Will You Still Be Mine?" (Tom Adair, Matt Dennis) – 4:59
 "Joy Spring" (Clifford Brown) – 7:33
 "A Gal in Calico" (Leo Robin, Arthur Schwartz) – 6:14
 "52nd Street Theme" (Thelonious Monk) – 4:23
 Jo Jones Introduction – 1:39
 "Monitor Blues" (Roy Eldridge, Sonny Stitt) – 7:13
 "Willow Weep for Me" (Ann Ronell) – 3:15
 "Autumn in New York" (Vernon Duke) – 2:46
 "Roy's Son" (Eldridge, Stitt) – 9:01

Personnel

Performance
 Sonny Stitt – alto saxophone, tenor saxophone
 Roy Eldridge – trumpet
 Oscar Peterson – piano
 Ray Brown – double bass
 Herb Ellis – guitar
 Jo Jones – drums

References

Oscar Peterson live albums
Albums produced by Norman Granz
Albums recorded at the Newport Jazz Festival
1957 live albums
Verve Records live albums
1957 in Rhode Island